Yklymberdi Paromov (born  1965) is  a Turkmen politician. He is the Minister of Textile Industry of Turkmenistan since May 2006.

Born in Mary District, in 1990 he graduated from the Turkmen State University as a qualified history teacher. In 2005 he was appointed first deputy of the Foreign Minister and since 2006 head of the Presidential Property Management Department and Textile Industry of Turkmenistan.

References
New government of Turkmenistan

1965 births
Living people
People from Mary Region
Government ministers of Turkmenistan
Turkmen State University alumni